Magen Abraham Synagogue is the only Jewish synagogue of Gujarat state situated in Ahmedabad, India. It was built in 1934 using donations from members of the Bene Israel Jewish community of the state.

History and location
The corner stone of the synagogue was laid on 19 October 1933 by Abigailbai Benjamin Issac Bhonker. The synagogue was consecrated on 2 September 1934.  The synagogue stands across the street from a Parsi Fire Temple at Bukhara Mohulla in Khamasa in the old Ahmedabad. It is included in the heritage list of the city.

Architecture

The synagogue is built in the Indo-Judaic art deco style with marble chequered floors and a large ark. It is built in an Indo-Judaica architectural form. The furniture consists of movable pews arranged around a central Bimah. The Ark contains multiple Torahs of many sizes and in hard cases. The women's balcony is unusual (as compared to other synagogues in India) in that it is not supported by pillars. The synagogue has Grecian pillars with triangular roof and high ceiling. There are several religious artifacts including artistic grills, stained glass windows and chandeliers.

Community
The Jewish community in Ahmedabad has shrunk considerably in the past few decades with many families emigrating to Israel, the United States and Europe. There were 120 members in 2020. Members of the community have been prominent in the educational field in Ahmedabad. Notable institutions include the Nelson's group of schools, the Best School and many others.

Culture
The synagogue has a small but still active community. The communal celebration of Pesah (Passover) still takes place and High Holy Days are observed annually.

References

External links

 Official site

Bene Israel
Synagogues in India
Art Deco synagogues
Orthodox Judaism in India
Orthodox synagogues
Religious buildings and structures in Ahmedabad
Sephardi Jewish culture in India
Sephardi synagogues